Shooting at the 1980 Summer Olympics took place at the Dynamo Shooting Range in Mytishchi in eastern part of Moscow between 20 and 26 July. Seven events were contested. Although events were mixed, i.e. open to both men and women, all medals were swept by men, and there were only 5 women competing compared to 77 in Los Angeles 1984, which introduced separate female events.

Medal summary

Events

Participating nations
A total of 239 shooters, 234 men and 5 women, from 38 nations competed at the Moscow Games:

References

External links 
 IOC Site on 1980 Summer Olympics

 
1980 Summer Olympics events
Olympics
Shooting competitions in Russia
Mytishchinsky District